The Dissolution of Colleges Act 1545 (37 Hen 8 c 4) was an Act of the Parliament of England.

Sections 13 and 16 were repealed by section 1(1) of, and Schedule 1 to, the Statute Law Revision Act 1950.

The whole Act, so far as unrepealed, was repealed by section 1 of, and Part II of the Schedule to, the Statute Law (Repeals) Act 1969.

References
Halsbury's Statutes,

See also
 Chantry § Abolition of Chantries Acts, 1545 and 1547

Acts of the Parliament of England (1485–1603)
1545 in law
1545 in England